Hargnies may refer to the following places in France:

 Hargnies, Ardennes, a commune in the Ardennes department
 Hargnies, Nord, a commune in the Nord department